Spiked crested coralroot is a common name for two plants which are sometimes considered to belong to the same species:

Hexalectris arizonica
Hexalectris spicata